Oscar Ambrosius Castberg (30 September 1846 – 18 June 1917) was a Norwegian painter and sculptor.

Bkiography
He was born at Bygland in Aust-Agder, Norway . His father, physician Tycho Fredrik Edvard Castberg, was the oldest living son of priest and politician  Peter Hersleb Harboe Castberg. Oscar Ambrosius Castberg was the nephew of  customs surveyor Johan Christian Tandberg Castberg and first cousin of Johan and Torgrim Castberg. Oscar Ambrosius Castberg had one older brother,  banker Peter Harboe Castberg.

Oscar Ambrosius Castberg first tried his luck at sea, but gave this up due to problems with seasickness. Instead, he took a sculptor's education, studying with a public grant under Julius Middelthun in Christiania and Jens Adolf Jerichau in Copenhagen. Due to the difficulty of surviving from sculpting alone, he also became a painter. He took up landscape painting on a naturalistic basis with motifs principally  from Kristiania and the surrounding area. He is represented with one work in the National Gallery of Norway.

Castberg died in 1917 in Kristiania.

References 

1846 births
1917 deaths
People from Bygland
19th-century Norwegian painters
20th-century Norwegian painters
Norwegian male painters
20th-century Norwegian sculptors
19th-century sculptors
19th-century Norwegian male artists
20th-century Norwegian male artists